Sarah Thomas (born 12 January 1981, in Aberdare) is a Welsh field hockey midfield and forward player, who was a member of the Wales and Great Britain women's field hockey team since making her GB debut in 1997.  She was part of the team that won bronze at the 2012 Summer Olympics.

Domestic career
Thomas played professionally for Dutch team HC Rotterdam for 8 seasons. She was voted the side's player of the season in 2007. She left the club in 2011 in order to return to the UK and focus on getting selected for the 2012 GB women's hockey squad.

International career
Thomas represented Wales at all age groups from the under 16s up to and including the senior national side, whom she first played for in 1997. She subsequently captained the side at the 2010 Commonwealth Games. She was also a member of the GB women's hockey teams, winning 53 caps for the side. She was a member of the squad at both the 2008 Summer Olympics and the 2012 Summer Olympics, winning a bronze medal at the latter.

Personal life
Thomas has a degree in Exercise & Sports Sciences from the University of Exeter.

Retirement
Thomas retired from playing for Wales in 2010. She then retired from domestic hockey in 2011, and finally from all other international hockey in 2013, stating that she felt content with her career having finally won an Olympic medal.

References

British Olympic profile

External links
 
 

1981 births
Living people
Welsh female field hockey players
British female field hockey players
Olympic field hockey players of Great Britain
Field hockey players at the 2008 Summer Olympics
Olympic medalists in field hockey
Olympic bronze medallists for Great Britain
Welsh Olympic medallists
Sportspeople from Aberdare
Field hockey players at the 2012 Summer Olympics
Medalists at the 2012 Summer Olympics
HC Rotterdam players